Active euthanasia is illegal in the United Kingdom.

Passive euthanasia

Although it is an offence to actively end a patient's life, many doctors still assist their patients with their wishes by withholding treatment and reducing pain, "according to a 2006 article in the Guardian".  This, however, is only done when the doctors feel that "’death is a few days away and after consulting patients, relatives or other doctors".

Advance decision

In England and Wales, people may make an advance decision or appoint a proxy under the Mental Capacity Act 2005. By effect of this law, the Advance Decision to Refuse Treatment (ADRT) acquired statutory force among doctors, patient and their families.
This is for an advanced refusal of life-saving treatment for when the person lacks mental capacity and must be considered to be valid and applicable by the medical staff concerned.

Permanent vegetative state

In July 2018 the Supreme Court of the United Kingdom ruled in An NHS Trust and others (Respondents) v Y (by his litigation friend, the Official Solicitor) and another (Appellants) that legal permission was not required to withdraw treatment from patients in a permanent vegetative state.

Subsequently, in December 2018, the British Medical Association and the Royal College of Physicians jointly published guidance on when doctors are permitted to allow patients to die. The chair of the ethics committee at the BMA, John Chisholm, said "The aim of medical treatment is not simply to prolong life at all costs."

Regicide
In January 1936, as King George V lay comatose on his deathbed, his doctor injected him with fatal doses of morphine and cocaine for the purpose of hastening his death so that it could be announced in the morning newspapers rather than the less appropriate evening journals.

Double effect doctrine
While euthanasia remains illegal in the United Kingdom, it is not uncommon for a patient’s death to be hastened and for there to be no legal ramifications attached to the physician that caused the death. Indeed, Lord Goff ruled in Airedale NHS Trust v Bland that doctors who intentionally do everything necessary and appropriate to relieve a patient’s pain and suffering, even with the foresight of possible terminal consequences, are considered legally protected when a death is hastened.

Assisted suicide

Assisted suicide is related to, but distinct from, voluntary euthanasia. Voluntary euthanasia is the act of ending the life of another for the purpose of relieving their suffering. Assisted suicide is the ending of one's own life with the assistance of another. The phrase "assisted dying" is often used instead of assisted suicide by proponents of legalisation and the media when used in the context of a medically assisted suicide for the purpose of relieving suffering. "Assisted dying" is also the phrase used by politicians when bills are proposed in parliament.

Child euthanasia

The Nuffield Council on Bioethics launched an enquiry in into critical care in foetal and neonatal medicine, looking at the ethical, social and legal issues which may arise when making decisions surrounding treating extremely premature babies.

See also

 Assisted suicide in the United Kingdom
 Alfie Evans case
 All-Party Parliamentary Group for Choice at the End of Life
 Dignity in Dying
 Exit International
 My Death My Decision

References